Mario Brunello (born 1960) is an Italian cellist and musician, who is currently Artistic Director of the International String Quartet Competition Premio Paolo Borciani and of the Reggio Emilia String Quartet Festival. Brunello plays a 17th century Maggini cello which, in the 20th century, belonged to Benedetto Mazzacurati and then to Franco Rossi, cellist of the "Quartetto Italiano". He has played with many orchestras internationally and has performed with various artists.

Life and career

Origins and musical beginnings
Brunello was born in Castelfranco Veneto, Italy. He studied under Adriano Vendramelli of the Venice Conservatorio of Music and of Antonio Janigro. In 1986, he was awarded the first prize at the International Tchaikovsky Competition, Moscow, in the cello section.

In 1994, Brunello founded the "Orchestra d'Archi Italiana" (Italian String Orchestra), starting a double performing activities as a conductor in addition to that of soloist and touring in many European countries.

Later Career
Since then Brunello has played with the many orchestras in the world: London Philharmonic, Royal Philharmonic, Munich Philharmonic, Philadelphia Orchestra, Orchestre National de France, NHK Symphony Orchestra (Tokyo), Scala Philharmonic Orchestra, Santa Cecilia, only to name a few, and under conductors such as Valery Gergiev, Zubin Mehta, Riccardo Muti, Yuri Temirkanov, Riccardo Chailly, Ton Koopman, Seiji Ozawa, Daniele Gatti, Myung-Whun Chung and Claudio Abbado.

As a chamber musician Brunello has performed with artists, including Gidon Kremer, Martha Argerich, Frank Peter Zimmermann, Yuri Bashmet, Maurizio Pollini, Andrea Lucchesini, Valery Afanassiev and the Borodin and Alban Berg Quartets.

References

Discography
 2010 - Mario Brunello - Bach - sei suites a violoncello solo senza basso - brunello series EGEA - Recorded at Auditorium Santa Cecilia - Perugia -Italy - 2009.
 2009 - Mario Brunello - cello / Andrea Lucchesini - piano - Lekeu Sonata for cello and piano in F major - Schubert Sonata for Arpeggione and piano in A minor D.821 - brunello series EGEA - Recorded at Auditorium Scuola Comunale Chiappano (Vicenza) -Italy -2004
 2009 - Mario Brunello - Antonio Vivaldi - CONCERTI PER VIOLONCELLO - brunello series EGEA
 2009 - Mario Brunello - VIOLONCELLO AND - brunello series - Recorded at Chiesa Monastica del Monastero di Bose (Italia) 25-27 Ottobre 2004
 2008 - Mario Brunello / orchestra d'archi italiana - Odusia - brunello series - Recorded at Auditorium Santa Cecilia - Perugia -Italy
 2002 - XRCD2 Mario Brunello Alone (JVC) Sollima - Ligeti - Casado

External links
 
 

1960 births
Italian classical cellists
Living people
People from Castelfranco Veneto